The Roku Channel is an American over-the-top video streaming service owned and operated by Roku, Inc., which launched in September 2017.

History
In September 2017, Roku, Inc. launched a free, ad-supported streaming channel for its digital media players, Roku.

The service has licensing deals for content with Sony Pictures, Warner Bros., Metro-Goldwyn-Mayer, Lionsgate, and Paramount Pictures, and also has content from existing Roku channel partners American Classics, FilmRise, Nosey, OVGuide, Popcornflix, Vidmark, and YuYu. The channel offers premium subscriptions for channels like HBO, Cinemax, Showtime, Epix, and Paramount+.

On August 8, 2018, The Roku Channel became available on the web as a standalone website. Originally only available in the United States, it launched in the United Kingdom on April 7, 2020, with a different selection of movies and TV shows.

On January 8, 2021, Roku announced that it had acquired the original content library of the defunct mobile video service Quibi for an undisclosed amount, reported to be around $100 million. The content was rebranded as Roku Originals.

The service was launched in Mexico on October 13, 2022.

Content

As of January 2021, the service has over 40,000 movies and TV shows. Through the acquisition of Quibi's original content library, an additional 75 shows and documentaries are available exclusively on the service as Roku Originals.

References

External links
 

Internet television streaming services
Subscription video streaming services
Internet properties established in 2017
Internet television channels